"" (You my soul sing) is a hymn in German by Paul Gerhardt, a paraphrase of Psalm 146. Johann Georg Ebeling wrote the well-known melody in 1666. The song in 10 stanzas was first published in 1667 in the collection   (Spiritual devotions by Paul Gerhardt) of songs by Gerhardt. It is No. 302 in the current Protestant hymnal .

History and text 
Paul Gerhardt wrote the hymn as a paraphrase of Psalm 146, in 1653, five years after the end of the Thirty Years War, when he was a minister in Mittenwalde, south of Berlin. Johann Georg Ebeling, a church musician at the Nikolaikirche, wrote the well-known melody in 1666. The song in 10 stanzas with eight regular lines each was first published in 1667 in the collection  (Spiritual devotions) of songs by Gerhardt. It is, shortened to eight stanzas, No. 302 in the current Protestant hymnal .

The first stanza, expressing the request to the own soul to sing beautifully praising the creator for life, corresponds to verses 1 and 2 of the psalm. Stanzas 2 and 3 are not part of the current Protestant hymnal. The fourth stanza, about trust in the God of Jacob as the highest treasure, granting eternal content ("ewig unbetrübt"), corresponds to verses 5 and 6. Stanzas five to seven expand the good things God does, namely protecting those who suffer violence, feeding the hungry and setting prisoners free, corresponding to verse 7. Stanzas eight and nine mention the light for the blind and comforter of the weak, strangers, orphans and widows as in verses 8 and 9. The last stanza, corresponding to verse 10, compares the singer to a wilted flower, who will not cease to add to the praise of God.

Tune and settings 
The tune (in B♭-major or C major) begins with a rising broken chord, reaching the tenth on the fifth note, which has been called a "rocket" motif. It follows the structure of the bar form. For the last two lines, the melody is similar in shape to the first two lines, again rising to the highest note in five steps and holding it for two beats. In the first stanza this accents the term "being" in "My heart and whole being" ("Mein Herz und ganzes Wesen").

Other hymns on the same melody include "Lift up your hearts, ye people", "We stand united with you" and "Give thanks to God, the Father".

References

External links 
 Berthold Haerter Predigt zu Paul Gerhardts Lied: Du meine Seele singe und Psalm 146 oberrieden.ch 29 July 2012

17th-century hymns in German
Lutheran hymns based on Psalms
1666 works
Hymn tunes
Hymns by Paul Gerhardt